The Floyd Jacobs House is a historic home located in Kansas City, Missouri.  It was designed by architect Mary Rockwell Hook and built in 1925 in Late 19th and 20th Century Revivals, and other architectural styles. The house was designed to demonstrate the value of hillside lots in its development. It is a three-story, hip roofed dwelling faced in rubble stone and stucco. The design had to accommodate slope and frontage on two streets at different levels.  It became home to Floyd Jacobs, a lawyer.

It was listed on the National Register of Historic Places in 1983.

References

Houses on the National Register of Historic Places in Missouri
Houses completed in 1925
Houses in Kansas City, Missouri
National Register of Historic Places in Kansas City, Missouri